Aleksander Saar (23 July 1883 Lustivere Parish (now Põltsamaa Parish), Kreis Fellin – 1 August 1942 Kirov, Russian SFSR) was an Estonian politician. He was a member of I Riigikogu.

References

1883 births
1942 deaths
People from Põltsamaa Parish
People from Kreis Fellin
Farmers' Assemblies politicians
Patriotic League (Estonia) politicians
Members of the Riigikogu, 1920–1923
Members of the Riigikogu, 1929–1932
Members of the Estonian National Assembly
Members of the Riigivolikogu
Estonian people executed by the Soviet Union